The Presbyterian Church in Korea (GaeHyukHapDong III) is a Reformed Presbyterian denomination in South Korea. In 2004 it had 4,065 members and 23 congregations. The denomination adheres to the Apostles Creed and the Westminster Confession.

References 

Presbyterian denominations in South Korea
Presbyterian denominations in Asia